"Blame It on the Girls" is the third and final single released from singer-songwriter Mika's second studio album, The Boy Who Knew Too Much. The single was released on 15 February 2010. The song was produced and mixed by Greg Wells. It is also played in the credits of the film Monte Carlo.

Description
In an interview with Q magazine, Mika says:  The song was inspired by a well-dressed, good-looking man Mika and his sister saw walking down a street in London shouting down his phone. The song uses a musical technique called musique concrète in which the music is devised by using everyday objects to make sound. In this particular song, the beat is created by Mika hitting his desk, clapping his hands and stamping his feet.

Notable live performances
In the United States, Mika performed the song on Good Morning America on 25 September, the Late Show with David Letterman on 14 October, and The Ellen DeGeneres Show on 22 October 2009. Mika also performed the song live numerous times around its release in the UK to help promote the song. He performed the song on So You Think You Can Dance on 30 January, as well as on Alan Carr: Chatty Man on the 11th, and on The Album Chart Show on Channel 4 on the 12th. He further performed the song on ITV1 three times in February: On the 5th he sang "Blame It on the Girls" and an operatic rendition of his other single "Rain" on Popstar to Operastar. On 18 February, Mika performed the song live on GMTV and made a final appearance on Movie Toons on the 27th to end his promotion of the single.

Music video

The music video for "Blame It on the Girls" was directed by Nez Khammal. An unfinished version of the video premiered on 3 October 2009 in the United Kingdom on Channel 4. The video starts in black and white with Mika sitting on a chair, wearing a bowler hat and holding a cane whilst speaking a prologue to the song. As the music starts the video bursts into colour, showing three screens behind Mika, each showing him in alternate colours of pink and blue. The screen to the left and right break away as female dancers dressed in half a tuxedo and half an orange dress dance into shot. As the chorus ends, the dancers disappear and Mika is seen sitting in a large sofa, he then gets up and moves over to a maze of mirrors, and then the girls join him again once the second chorus begins. The video is set in a film studio dressed in pastel colours with Mika playing a pastel pink piano. The video ends with him jumping into the air and the picture being frozen. The video features the appearance of the famous "one take video" seen in videos like OK Go's "Here it Goes Again," but actually contains cuts hidden with the use of portals. Portal transition is when the cut takes place within a movement into a different but similar image giving the appearance of one smooth camera movement but in reality has been cut. For example, at 1:50 minutes into the video we see this portal transition happen using the image in the mirror. Another example of the hidden editing in this music video is seen at 1:10 into the video where we get a cross dissolve cut from one moving shot to another giving the appearance of a swift moving camera. Other "hidden cuts" are at 2:21, 2:32 and 3:09.

Track listing
 Digital download
 "Blame It on the Girls" – 3:33 
 "Blame It on the Girls" (Wolfgang Gartner Remix) – 6:16
 "Blame It on the Girls" (Not on the Starsmith Remix) – 6:14
 "Blame It on the Girls" (Music Video)

 CD single
 "Blame It on the Girls" (Wolfgang Gartner Remix) – 6:16
 "Blame It on the Girls" (Paul Woodford Remix) – 3:56
 "Blame It on the Girls" (Alalal Remix) – 5:18
 "Blame It on the Girls" (Anoraak Remix) – 5:12
 "Blame It on the Girls" (Not on the Starsmith Remix) – 6:14

Charts
The single failed to make any impact on Billboard in the United States. It was a big hit in Japan where it hit #1 for a week. It is only the second international single to hit #1 in the Japanese Hot 100, provided by Billboard, after Leona Lewis's 2008 hit, "Bleeding Love". However, on its week of release it failed to crack the Top 40 in the UK, and only charted at #72, exactly the same as his last single "Rain"s peak position, making "Blame It on the Girls" his second consecutive single to miss the UK Top 40.

Credits
Mika – vocals, background vocals
Cherisse Osei – drums
Greg Wells – drums, keyboards, percussion, programming
Fabien Waltmann – keyboards
Ida Falk Winland – background vocals

References

2009 songs
Mika (singer) songs
Billboard Japan Hot 100 number-one singles
Songs written by Mika (singer)
Song recordings produced by Greg Wells
2010 singles
Casablanca Records singles